Cardinal Dougherty High School (CDHS) was a private, Roman Catholic high school in Philadelphia, Pennsylvania.  It was located in the Roman Catholic Archdiocese of Philadelphia and established in the East Oak Lane section of Philadelphia at 6301 North Second Street. Although Cardinal Dougherty was founded as a co-institutional school, it became co-educational in 1983, with boys and girls being educated together in the same classrooms.

Marching band
The CDHS marching band performed for Pope Paul VI at the Vatican, the 1962 NFL Championship Game, Lyndon B. Johnson's presidential inauguration in 1965, and won the World Music Championship in the Netherlands in 1966.

Notable people

Alumni
 Brendan Boyle, Congressman
 Jim Callahan, NFL wide receiver
 Jim Cooper, NFL offensive tackle
 Corporal Michael Crescenz, US Army Medal of Honor awardee
 Jim Foster, women's basketball head coach
 Tom Gannon, Pennsylvania House of Representatives
 Len Hatzenbeller, professional basketball player
 Florian Kempf, NFL placekicker
 Kyle Lowry, NBA point guard
 Tom Makowski, MLB pitcher
 Seamus McCaffery, Pennsylvania Supreme Court
 Cuttino Mobley, NBA shooting guard
 Harry Swayne,  NFL offensive tackle
 Christopher Wogan, Pennsylvania House of Representatives, Philadelphia Common Pleas Court Judge

Staff
 Alex Ely, soccer midfielder, CDHS teacher and soccer coach

Notes and references

External links

 "Cardinal Dennis Joseph Dougherty". Time. Volume XXIX, Number 7, February 15, 1931.
 CatholicPhilly.com. "1964: Lessons from a Memorable Team." October 29, 2009.

Roman Catholic Archdiocese of Philadelphia
Defunct Catholic secondary schools in Pennsylvania
Irish-American culture in Philadelphia
Educational institutions established in 1956
1956 establishments in Pennsylvania
Educational institutions disestablished in 2010
2010 disestablishments in Pennsylvania